Rali Chauhan is a village in the Meerut district of Uttar Pradesh state, India, and forms a part of the National Capital Region (NCR). Rali Chauhan's Pincode is 250002. Nearby villages include Islamabad Chhilora, Bhawanpur, Datavali Gesupur, and Ajanta Colony.

Demographics

As of the 2011 Census of India.

Male Population - 1729
Female Population - 	1454
Children (ages 0–6) - 467
Total  Population - 3183
Total number of houses - 548
Language - Hindi

Compared with Uttar Pradesh as a whole, Rali Chauhan has a higher rate of literacy: 77.61% to 67.68%. The literacy among males is 86.62%, while that among women is 66.83%.

The village is led by a Sarpanch.

Public transport links

Meerut City Rail Way Station and Meerut Cantt Rail Way Station are the nearest rail stations to Rali Chauhan.

Colleges near Rali Chauhan
Nav Jeevan Inter College
Jan Hitkaari Inter College
Bharti College

References

Villages in Meerut district